Te Kūiti is a town in the north of the King Country region of the North Island of New Zealand. The town promotes itself as the sheep shearing capital of the world and is host to the annual New Zealand National Shearing Championships.

Te Kūiti is approximately 80 km south of Hamilton and 19 km south-east of Waitomo. The area around Te Kūiti, commonly known as the King Country, gives its name to the Heartland Championship rugby team based in Te Kūiti.

History and culture

Te Kūiti is the Maori name given to the area. In its original form of "Te Kuititanga", it literally means "the valley", "the squeezing in" or "the narrowing".

Several marae are located in and around Te Kūiti, associated with Ngāti Maniapoto hapū:
 Te Kumi Marae and Te Korapatu meeting house are affiliated with Ngāti Peehi and Rōrā
 Mōtītī Marae and Ko te Hungaiti or Hapainga meeting house are affiliated with Ngāti Kinohaku, Ngāti Putaitemuri and Ngāti Tauhunu
 Te Piruru Papakainga Marae and Te Pukenui o Taonui meeting house are affiliated with Ngāti Rōrā
 Tāne Hopuwai Marae and Tāne Hopuwai meeting house are affiliated with Ngāti Apakura
 Te Tokanganui a Noho Marae and meeting house are affiliated with Ngāti Rōrā. This wharenui was constructed in 1873 for Te Kooti and his followers, and was one of the largest wharenui ever built at the time.
 Tomotuki Marae and Parekatini meeting house are affiliated with Apakura, Parekaitini and Ngāti Rōrā
 Te Waipatoto Marae, and Waipatoto and Waipatoto Tuarua meeting houses, are affiliated with Ngāti Kinohaku

Geography

Limestone deposits and water have created the Waitomo Caves, northwest of the town, one of New Zealand's most-visited tourist locations. The town itself is located in a valley with many rich limestone deposits. The Manga-o-Kewa Stream runs through the valley and is a tributary of the Waipa River.
Te Kūiti's hinterland consist mainly of farmland and limestone quarries. The land surrounding Te Kūiti has steep hilly relief which reflects the nature of the North King Country region.
The climate of Te Kūiti is wet during the winter and dry during the late summer with an average of 1,450mm of rainfall each year.

Demographics

Te Kūiti had a population of 4,572 at the 2018 New Zealand census, an increase of 315 people (7.4%) since the 2013 census, and an increase of 78 people (1.7%) since the 2006 census. There were 1,611 households, comprising 2,241 males and 2,331 females, giving a sex ratio of 0.96 males per female, with 1,041 people (22.8%) aged under 15 years, 894 (19.6%) aged 15 to 29, 1,872 (40.9%) aged 30 to 64, and 768 (16.8%) aged 65 or older.

Ethnicities were 51.7% European/Pākehā, 55.2% Māori, 5.6% Pacific peoples, 5.7% Asian, and 1.3% other ethnicities. People may identify with more than one ethnicity.

The percentage of people born overseas was 11.4, compared with 27.1% nationally.

Although some people chose not to answer the census's question about religious affiliation, 50.2% had no religion, 32.7% were Christian, 4.4% had Māori religious beliefs, 1.1% were Hindu, 1.0% were Muslim, 0.5% were Buddhist and 1.4% had other religions.

Of those at least 15 years old, 318 (9.0%) people had a bachelor's or higher degree, and 1,047 (29.7%) people had no formal qualifications. 222 people (6.3%) earned over $70,000 compared to 17.2% nationally. The employment status of those at least 15 was that 1,566 (44.4%) people were employed full-time, 561 (15.9%) were part-time, and 195 (5.5%) were unemployed.

Tourism

The "Shearing Capital of the World" contains the world's largest shearer, seven metres high. On 1 April 2006 the largest sheep show in the world took place here, with more than 2000 sheep.

The carved Te Tokanganui-A-Noho Meeting House was gifted to the local Maori people (Ngāti Maniapoto) by Te Kooti, the most famous Maori Rebel leader of the 19th century. He was given sanctuary by the Chiefs of Maniapoto against the white colonial Government of New Zealand and under Maniapoto's protection carved one of the most famous and important late 19th century spiritual house in the north island.(as mentioned above). This House is central to Te Kūiti's historical foundation, also referred to as the epicenter of the Rohe Pōtae.. "King Country"...In 1881 the last frontier was open to colonial settlers.

The Tatsuno Japanese Garden is at the southern end of the main street.

The Mangaokewa reserve located 5 km south of Te Kūiti is a popular attraction for rock climbers, hikers, picnic goers, swimmers and trout fisherman in the region.

A 'Revitalisation Project' for the NZHPT Category II listed Te Kuiti railway station was started in 2014 to provide for arts and crafts groups, an education centre, youth projects, historical displays and a meeting room. The Rail Heritage Trust describes the station as, "the finest remaining example of a standard class B station".

Sport

Te Kūiti is the home of the Waitete Rugby Football Club and the King Country Rugby Union, both of whom are based at Rugby Park. The famous Colin Meads spent the entirety of his career with both Waitete and King Country. The town also has an association football club, Te Kuiti Albion Football Club, who play in the Deacon Shield tournament.  They play their home games at Centennial Park where there is a small clubroom.  The club colours are yellow and black striped shirts and black shorts.

Education

Te Kūiti has six schools:

All these schools are co-educational. Rolls are as of

Notable people

 Ross Beever, geneticist and mycologist.
 Rodney Bell, contemporary dancer
 Former Prime Minister of New Zealand Jim Bolger held the local electorate of King Country.
 All Black Kevin Boroevich
 Walter Broadfoot (1881–1965), cabinet minister for the National Party, was first deputy mayor and then mayor of Te Kūiti (1923–1935)
 Kim Chambers, marathon swimmer.
World Champion Sheep Shearer David Fagan
 Kerri-Jo Te Huia, champion sheep shearer
 Murray Kidd, Former rugby union coach for the Irish national team (1995–1997).
 Tony Martin, Australia-based comedian and author
 All Black Sir Colin Meads lived in Te Kūiti. The auction of his farm in 2008 caused nationwide interest. A statue of Meads was unveiled in the town centre during the 2017 British & Irish Lions tour to New Zealand, also drawing national interest, and Meads was present and spoke at the unveiling despite battling cancer, which he died from two months later.
 Colin Meads's brother Stanley Meads also lived in Te Kūiti.
 Les Munro, the last surviving pilot from the Dambusters air raid, was mayor for some years and has a street named in his honour.
 Ruth Park, author
 Kevin Proctor - Gold Coast Titans, Rugby League player
 Diggeress Te Kanawa, a tohunga raranga (master weaver) of Ngati Maniapoto and Ngati Kinohaku descent
 Rob Waddell, Olympic gold-medalist rower

References

External links

 Waitomo District Council Te Kūiti Information Centre
 Map of Te Kūiti and surrounding area